Moghol (or Mogholi;) is a critically endangered or possibly extinct Mongolic language spoken in the province of Herat, Afghanistan, in the villages of Kundur and Karez-i-Mulla. The speakers were the Moghol people, who numbered 2,000 members in the 1970s. They descend from the remnants of Genghis Khan's Mongol army stationed in Afghanistan in the 13th century. 

In the 1970s, when the German scholar Michael Weiers did fieldwork on the language, few people spoke it, most knew it passively and most were older than 40. It is unknown if there are still speakers of the language.

The language has been strongly influenced by Persian in its phonology, morphology and syntax, causing Weiers to state that it has the appearance of a "true Inner Asian creole language".

Script 
Historically, the Moghol language was written using a modified version of the Perso-Arabic script. Extant Moghol literature included Islamic texts, poetry, Mogholi-Persian vocabularies, and Mogholi grammars.

Grammar
Moghol grammar shows substantial influence from Persian languages, having borrowed even word classes not found in other Mongolic languages: the parts of speech are nouns, verbs, adjectives, pronouns, prepositions, adverbs and conjunctions. 

Nouns are marked for number and case. Verbs are marked for person, number, tense-aspect and mode. Adjectives inflect for the comparative and superlative degree with the Persian suffixes -tar and -tariin, but not for number and case.

Phonology
Moghol's phonology is influenced by Persian. It has a system of six vowel qualities with no length contrast: .

Sample
Weiers noted down the following poem by the Moghol poet Abd Al-Qadir. 

Another Moghol poem or song of Abd Al-Qadir written in Arabic alphabet (from Weiers):

Pronouns
The Moghol personal pronouns are:

The demonstrative pronouns are:
inah ~ enah ‘this’
inat ~ enad ‘these’
mun ~ munah ‘that’
munat ~ mutah ~ mutat ‘those’

The interrogative pronouns are:
emah ~ imah ~ imas ‘what’
ken ~ kiyan ‘who’
kenaiki ‘whose’
emadu ~ imadu ~ emaji ~ imaji ~ emagalah ‘why’
emaula- ‘to do what’
ked ~ keddu ‘how much’
keja ‘when’
oshtin ‘how’

The reflexive pronouns are:
orin ‘self’ 
orindu-nah ‘for oneself’
usa-nah ‘self’

Numerals
The Moghol numerals are Janhunen (2003):

Notes

See also
Nikudari

Further reading
 G. J. Ramstedt. 1906. "Mogholica. Beiträge zur kenntnis der moghol-sprache in Afghanistan." JSFOu 23-4.
 Louis Ligeti. 1954. "Le lexique moghol de R. Leech," AOH 4.
 Л. Лигети. 1954. "О монгольских и тюркиских языках и диалектах Афганистана," AOH 4.
 Sh. Iwamura and H. F. Schurmann. 1954. "Notes on Mongolian Groups in Afghanistan," Silver Jubilee Volume of the Zinbun-Kagaku-Kenkyusyo, Kyoto University. Kyoto University.
 Shinobu Iwamura. 1961. The Zirni Manuscript: A Persian-Mongolian Glossary and Grammar. Kyoto University.
 H. F. Schurmann. 1962. The Moghols of Afghanistan. Mouton & Co.
 Michael Weiers. 1972. Die Sprache der Moghol der Provinz Herat in Afghanistan (Sprachmaterial, Grammatik, Wortliste). Opladen: Westdeutscher Verlag.

Agglutinative languages
Mongolic languages
Languages of Afghanistan
Extinct languages of Asia